Klots Throwing Company Mill is a historic silk mill located at Cumberland in Allegany County, Maryland, United States.  It was built in 1902–1903, and is a long two-story brick building with double-gable roofs and paired stepped parapets. An addition was built in 1909. It was operated by Gentex Corporation and closed in 1972. The building was subsequently used for storage. From 1988 until 2002, the north end of the building housed the Western Maryland Food Bank. The building will be converted to loft apartments.

It was listed on the National Register of Historic Places in 2010.

References

External links
, at Maryland Historical Trust
Klots Throwing Company records at Hagley Museum and Library

Industrial buildings and structures on the National Register of Historic Places in Maryland
Industrial buildings completed in 1903
Buildings and structures in Cumberland, Maryland
Silk mills in the United States
National Register of Historic Places in Allegany County, Maryland